Andrew Paton (2 January 1923 – 8 February 2014) was a Scottish football player and manager.

A centre half, Paton played primarily for Motherwell, with a short spell at Hamilton Academical late in his career, and he then managed Hamilton for nine years. He won the Scottish Cup, Scottish League Cup and Scottish Division Two with Motherwell – having joined as a teenager from the Junior level during World War II – and in 2006 was voted the club's 'greatest ever player'. On 10 November 2020, it was announced that Paton was to be inducted into the Motherwell F.C. Hall of Fame.

He appeared three times for Scotland; his debut came in January 1946 against Belgium (considered official by the national associations, unlike two other fixtures he played in the same immediate post-war period) and his second and third appearances were made on a summer 1952 tour of Scandinavia. At the time of his death in 2014 (aged 91), he was the oldest surviving Scotland international.

References

External links

1923 births
2014 deaths
Scottish footballers
Footballers from Irvine, North Ayrshire
Association football central defenders
Scotland international footballers
Scotland wartime international footballers
Motherwell F.C. players
Hamilton Academical F.C. players
Scottish Football League players
Scottish Junior Football Association players
Scottish football managers
Hamilton Academical F.C. managers
Kello Rovers F.C. players
Irvine Meadow XI F.C. players
Scottish Football League managers
Association football player-managers